Thomas Trent Lewis II (born 16 November 1979), known professionally as Trent Lewis, is an American actor.

Early life
Lewis was born in West Hills, California.

Career
Lewis is best known for his role as Dr. Swank on the Syfy comedy series Outer Space Astronauts. He continues to improvise with such groups as ComedySportz and Upright Citizens Brigade Theatre.

Filmography

Television

References

External links

1979 births
American male film actors
Living people
American Protestants
People from West Hills, Los Angeles